Brinkburn Priory is a former monastery built, starting in the 12th century, on a bend of the River Coquet, about  east of Rothbury, Northumberland, England. 

The priory church survived the dissolution of the monasteries because it was also a parish church. After decline in the post-dissolution centuries the church was restored in the 19th century. It is a grade I listed building in the care of English Heritage. Little survives of the other monastic structures, on the site of which a manor house, just south of the church, now stands.

Early history
Brinkburn was founded by William Bertram, Baron of Mitford, in the reign of Henry I as an Augustinian priory. The exact date is not known but cannot have been later than 1135, as Henry died that year. About 1180 or so, Brinkburn became an independent house, and the building of the monastic church was commenced. The architectural style has been described as "transitional" (i.e. between Norman and Gothic).

Although the Priory acquired lands in Northumberland and Durham over the years it was never particularly wealthy. Little is known of the early history of the priory, although it is known that it survived some difficult times. In fact, as late as 1419 it was raided and robbed.

Dissolution
Brinkburn Priory was dissolved in 1536 after Parliament enacted the Dissolution of the Lesser Monasteries Act. The "lesser monasteries" were those with an income of less than £200 per annum, and Brinkburn fell into this category as in 1535 the priory's value had been recorded as £69 in the Valor Ecclesiasticus. After the dissolution the estate was mainly owned by the Fenwick family, and in the late 16th century they built a manor house just south of the priory church, on the site of some of the other priory buildings.

Services continued to be held at Brinkburn, and the church was retained in a fair state of repair till the end of the 16th century. In 1602 it was reported to be in a state of decay, and at some point before 1700 the roof collapsed and regular services were abandoned.

Modern history

Church
In the 1750s Thomas Sharp, Archdeacon of Northumberland, tried to effect repairs to the ruin. Although there was considerable support for the project, work was called off after a dispute between the owner William Fenwick and the Vicar of Felton.

In the 19th century the Cadogan family, owners of Brinkburn, revived the plans for the restoration of the church and work began in 1858. The roof was completed in the space of a year, and the stained glass windows had been inserted by 1864. The church, however, was not furnished until 1868. Brinkburn Priory today is a sympathetic 19th-century restoration of the mediæval original.

The tombstone of Prior William, Bishop of Durham (died 1484) was found during the reconstruction, as was the original altar stone with five crosses. The latter is still preserved along with an ancient font.

Religious services are still occasionally held here. It has also been a venue for concerts, notably the Brinkburn Festival which was directed by Paul McCreesh.

Other buildings
The manor house, which utilises part of the vaulted undercroft to the monks' dining hall, presents a nineteenth-century appearance. It is a grade II* listed building.

Brinkburn Mill, once part of the Priory precinct, was rebuilt in the nineteenth century. It was refurbished in 1990 by the Landmark Trust.

The locally renowned "Brinkburn" on Brinkburn Road, Darlington is also part of the original estate.

In popular culture
The church was used for the scenes of Edmund Blackadder's consecration at Canterbury Cathedral in the episode "The Archbishop" of the first series of Blackadder in 1983.

See also
The causeway is a Roman road which starts at Portgate on Hadrian's Wall, north of Corbridge, and extends  northwards across Northumberland to the mouth of the River Tweed at Berwick-upon-Tweed.
 List of English abbeys, priories and friaries serving as parish churches

References

External links

Brinkburn Priory – official site at English Heritage
Events at Brinkburn Priory
Brinkburn Priory image—Nashford Publishing
Brinkburn image—Britannia

12th-century establishments in England
1536 disestablishments in England
Augustinian monasteries in England
Buildings and structures in Northumberland
Church of England church buildings in Northumberland
English Heritage sites in Northumberland
History of Northumberland
Grade I listed buildings in Northumberland
Scheduled monuments in Northumberland
Christian monasteries established in the 12th century
Monasteries dissolved under the English Reformation